The 98th New York Infantry Regiment was a unit of the Union Army during the American Civil War.

History

Regimental Organization
Company A – recruited principally in Franklin County
Company B – recruited principally in Franklin County 
Company C – recruited principally in Franklin County 
Company D – recruited principally in Franklin County 
Company E – recruited principally in Franklin County 
Company F – recruited principally in Wayne County
Company G – recruited principally in Franklin County 
Company H – recruited principally in Franklin County 
Company I – recruited principally in Wayne County
Company K – recruited principally in Wayne County

Time Line

Regiment losses

The 98th New York Infantry Regiment lost:
by death and killed in action:  2 officers and 61 enlisted men
of wounds received in action: 2 officers and 37 enlisted men
of disease and other causes: 4 officers and 132 enlisted men
total:  8 officers and 230 enlisted men
aggregate: 238 of whom 22 enlisted men died in the hands of the enemy

See also
New York in the American Civil War
List of New York Civil War regiments

References

Military units and formations established in 1862
1862 establishments in New York (state)
Infantry 98